The 2019 Northeast Conference men's basketball tournament was the postseason men's basketball tournament for the Northeast Conference for the 2018–19 NCAA Division I men's basketball season. All tournament games are played at the home arena of the highest seed. The tournament took place March 6 through March 12, 2019. Fairleigh Dickinson defeated Saint Francis (PA) 85–76 in the championship game to win the tournament, and received the NEC's automatic bid to the 2019 NCAA tournament.

Seeds
The top eight teams in the Northeast Conference are eligible to compete in the conference tournament. Teams were seeded by record within the conference, with a tiebreaker system to seed teams with identical conference records.

Schedule and results

Note: Bracket is re-seeded after quarterfinal matchups, with highest remaining seed playing the lowest remaining seed in the semifinals.

Bracket and results
Teams are reseeded after each round with highest remaining seeds receiving home court advantage.

All-tournament team
Tournament MVP in bold.

See also
2019 Northeast Conference women's basketball tournament

References

External links
2019 Northeast Conference Men's Basketball Championship

Northeast Conference men's basketball tournament
Tournament
Northeast Conference men's basketball tournament